Michel Vialay (born 6 January 1960) is a French Republican politician who has represented Yvelines's 8th constituency in the National Assembly since 2017.

References

External links 
 

1960 births
Living people
Politicians from Paris
People from Yvelines
21st-century French politicians
Deputies of the 15th National Assembly of the French Fifth Republic
The Republicans (France) politicians
Members of Parliament for Yvelines